Today's Special is a 2009 independent comedy film loosely inspired by Aasif Mandvi's play, Sakina's Restaurant. The film was directed by David Kaplan. The script was adapted by Aasif Mandvi and Jonathan Bines, and stars Mandvi, Madhur Jaffrey, Bollywood actor Naseeruddin Shah, Jess Weixler, Harish Patel, Kevin Corrigan, Dean Winters, and Ajay Naidu. The film was developed and produced by Nimitt Mankad of Inimitable Pictures, and Lillian LaSalle of Sweet 180.

The film premiered at the London Film Festival on October 16, 2009. In the United States, it was the opening film of the MIAAC Film Festival (Mahindra Indo American Arts Festival), at the Paris Theater in New York City. It played at the Mumbai Film Festival. At the Palm Springs International Film Festival on January 15, 2010, it won "Best of the Fest." It was also the Opening Night film at the San Francisco International Asian American Film Festival on March 11, 2010.

Plot
Samir (Aasif Mandvi), a sous chef at an upscale New York restaurant, gets frustrated with his boss (Dean Winters) and quits after being passed over for a head chef position. His dreams of studying French cuisine in France are shattered after his father becomes ill and he must take over his family's Indian restaurant, Tandoori Palace in Queens. The restaurant has two chefs who don't know what they're doing, an old-fashioned wall and faltering income since the only customers are Samir's uncles sitting at a table playing cards. Samir doesn't know what to do because his knowledge of Indian cooking is limited until he meets the larger-than-life gourmet chef and taxi driver Akbar (Naseeruddin Shah). Samir's world is transformed via Akbar's cooking lessons, the magic of the masala and a beautiful co-worker, Carrie (Jess Weixler). Meanwhile, his mother (Madhur Jaffrey) tries to get him to settle down with a nice Indian girl and his father, Hakkim (Harish Patel) is convinced he will amount to nothing. Samir, Akbar and the kitchen staff first update the restaurant's look. Then with Akbar's eccentric help, they concoct the most magical and mouthwatering dishes in what soon becomes the best little Indian restaurant in New York with booming business. However, Akbar moves to Akron, Ohio and it is up to Samir to run the restaurant. Meanwhile, Hakkim plans to sell the restaurant. Samir, along with help from his uncles and Carrie, improves business at the restaurant. Eventually, Hakkim calls off the deal and the movie ends with Hakkim hugging Samir.

Cast
 Aasif Mandvi as Samir
 Dean Winters as Steve
 Kevin Corrigan as Stanton
 Naseeruddin Shah as Akbar
 Jess Weixler as Carrie
 Ajay Naidu as Munnamia
 Kevin Breznahan as Freddie
 Harish Patel as Hakim
 Amir Arison as Dr. Semaan
 Madhur Jaffrey as Farrida
 Ranjit Chowdhry as Regular #1
 Kumar Pallana as Regular #2

Awards
 Best of the Fest Award at the 2010 Palm Springs International Film Festival
 Aasif Mandvi - Best Actor Award at the Mahindra Indo-American Arts Council (MIAAC) Film Festival

References

External links
 

2009 films
2009 comedy films
American comedy films
Films about Indian Americans
Films set in New York City
American independent films
Cooking films
2009 independent films
2000s English-language films
2000s American films